Milk caps is a children's game played with flat circular cardboard milk caps. Players make a stack of these caps, and take turns to drop a heavier "slammer" object onto it, causing the caps to be disrupted.

Each player keeps any face-up caps and is to restack the face-down caps, repeating the process until none land face-down, at which point the player who collected the most caps wins the game of milk caps.

The game is also known as Pogs, under which name it was sold commercially in the 1990s. The name originates from Pog, a brand of juice made from passionfruit, orange, and guava; the use of the juice's caps to play the game preceded the game's commercialization.

History

The game of milk caps possibly originated in Maui, Hawaii, during the 1920s or 1930s, or possibly with origins in Menko, a Japanese card game very similar to milk caps, which has been in existence since the 17th century, during the Edo period. The game of milk caps was played on the Hawaiian island of Maui as early as 1927.  There are cap collectors that have caps dating back to the 1940s and 1950s.

After new packaging made cardboard milk caps obsolete in the 1950s, manufacturers such as Haleakala Dairy and Orchards Hawaii occasionally distributed the caps as promotional items. When Haleakala used the caps to successfully promote the 1971 introduction of their fruit drink Pog, it led to a surge in similar promotions and milk cap collecting. In 1991, Haleakala expanded to the more populated Oahu island, which led to a revival of the game. With this revival, the Pog name began being used generically for the game.

The 1990s revival is credited to Blossom Galbiso, a teacher and guidance counselor who taught at Waialua Elementary School in Oahu. In 1991, Galbiso introduced the game she had played as a girl to a new generation of students, incorporating milk caps into her fifth grade curriculum as a way of teaching math and as a non-violent alternative to other popular schoolyard games, such as dodgeball. The game spread from Oahu's North Shore, and by early 1992, Stanpac Inc., a Canadian packaging company that had been manufacturing the milk caps distributed by Haleakala Dairy on Maui (the same caps that were collected by Galbiso for her class), was printing millions of milk caps every week for shipment to the Hawaiian island chain. The game spread to the mainland, first surfacing in California, Texas, Oregon, and Washington before spreading to the rest of the country. By 1993, the previously obscure game of milk caps, which had almost been forgotten, was played throughout the world. 

Milk caps returned to popularity when the World Pog Federation and the Canada Games Company reintroduced them under the Pog brand name in the 1990s. The Pog fad soared, and peaked in the mid-1990s. Pogs were being handed out for opening bank accounts and in McDonald's Happy Meals. With the end of the Pogs fad, Canada Games went out of business in 1997.

Seven other companies entered the milk cap field after a comic book and card industry convention in January 1993. SkyBox International and Marvel added the product to their lines under the names SkyCaps and Hero Caps respectively. The game had spread to California, Florida and Texas.

The term Pog was claimed as trademark by the World Pog Federation while other companies claimed it was a generic term as it was selected by the children that played the game. In October 1994, a lawsuit was settled between World Pog and Universal Pogs Association. Pog was recognized as World Pog's exclusive term and Universal Pogs changed its name to Universal Slammers, Inc.

Because many children would keep the milk caps they won in games from other players, many school districts considered milk caps a form of gambling. Milk caps proved to be major distractions from classes and the source of various playground arguments. These elements eventually led to the banning of milk caps from various schools across North America. Other bannings occurred across Australia and Sweden.

Equipment 
Milk caps generally involves two types of playing discs: milk caps and slammers. Milk caps are typically flat circular cardboard discs which are decorated with images on one or both sides. Traditional (or traditional-style) milk caps are made of rougher cardboard, are printed with limited colors, and often have a staple in them (as they appeared when used as actual POG bottlecaps), while modern commercial pogs were stiffer, thicker and are often printed with colorful glossy imagery.

The other equipment that is used is a slammer: a heavier game piece often made of metal, rubber, or more commonly plastic, which come in various thicknesses and weights. They are typically similar in diameter to milk caps. Metal slammers are not allowed in some games because they are usually heavier than other materials, giving the player with the first turn an unfair advantage, and have a tendency to damage the milk caps.

Gameplay 

Rules vary among players, but the game variants generally have common gameplay features. Each player has their own collection of milk caps and one or more slammers. Before the game, players decide whether or not to play "for keeps", i.e. players get to keep the milk caps that they win during the game and must forfeit those that have been won by other players. The game can then begin as follows:

 The players each contribute an equal number of milk caps to build a stack, which will be used during the game.
 The players take turns throwing their slammer down onto the top of the stack, causing it to spring up and the milk caps to scatter. Each player keeps any milk caps that have flipped over.
 After each throw, the milk caps which have not flipped over are then re-stacked for the next player.
 When no milk caps remain in the stack, the player with the most pogs is the winner.
Rules can be changed depending on who is playing, and where they are from.

World POG Federation 
The World POG Federation was the licensed POG publisher, which was 14% owned by Haleakala Dairy, the trademark holder of POGs. The company was based in Costa Mesa, California.

Global variants

Japan 

Menko (めんこ, 面子) is a Japanese card game played by two or more players, dating back to the 17th century. Each player uses Menko cards made from thick paper or cardboard, printed on one or both sides with images from anime, manga, and other works.

South Korea 

Ddakji or Ttakji is a South Korean game played by two or more players.

China 
It is known in China as wáah pín (Pinyin: huà piàn) (also called yang pian in northern China) and is printed on rectangular or circular cards.

Philippines

A similar game in the Philippines played by children is known as teks. It involves small collectible cards, originally of popular actors, and then later on of popular comics and cartoon characters. It dates back to the 1930s and involves flipping cards with a thumb and forefinger. The winner is whichever card lands face up. The loser has to give one of his collectible cards to the winner.

Catalonia 

"Patacó" is a traditional card game played by children in Catalonia in which the "patacons" are turned upside down, hit with the palm of the hand and, if they turn around, they win.

They are made with wasted Spanish playing cards.

In popular culture 
The PogChamp emote originates from a video titled "Pogs Championship" in which Ryan "Gootecks" Gutierrez wins a game of Pogs.

The Korean survival drama Netflix series, Squid Game, features a Korean variant of the game called ddakji. It is played during the initial challenge between Gong Yoo's salesperson character and the protagonist, Seong Gi-Hun, played by Lee Jung-Jae.

See also 

 Bachicombat
 Slammer Whammers
Tazos
 Skully (game), a disk based game
 Tiddlywinks, another disk based game, involving a pot at the center

References

External links 
 spakatak.com International Tazos Guide
 Reference site for AAFES pogs, with image galleries
 Information and images of pogs, tazos, flippos and other milkcaps
 Information and history about the milkcap craze

1990s fads and trends
1990s toys
Children's games
Collectible-based games
Street games